Cristian Dorel Scutaru (born 13 April 1987 ) is a Romanian footballer who plays as a defender for Liga IV side CSC Peciu Nou.

Club career

Early career
Scutaru began his youth career at CSM Reșița. His former coach, Ioan Sdrobiș said that the young and solid defender is poised to become the next Chivu, whom he had also trained while still a youngster.

CSM Reșița 
The younger defender plays for the first time for his hometown's CSM Reșița 12 matches .

Jiul Petroșani 
After impress in just 12 matches at Reșița, Scutaru transferred to first divisioner Jiul Petroșani, but plays just one match.

Politehnica Timișoara 
Scutaru was promoted by Gheorghe Hagi and made his debut during the Liga I 2005/2006 season against his former team Jiul Petroșani. Step by step, Scutaru became important man in first eleven. After chairman Marian Iancu appointed Vladimir Petrović as new coach, he reprofilate Scutaru as left defender. He scored his first goals for Poli in 2-1 won against Sportul Studențesc scoring twice.

CFR Timișoara 
After appearing a number of times at CFR Timișoara (Poli's "B" team at the time) he was recalled to Poli.

FCM Reșița 
He returned to hometown's FCM Reșița on loan making 11 appearances and scores one goal.

CS Buftea 
Scutaru was loaned out to Buftea for six months time where was appointed the new captain of the team and plays 22 matches, and scored one goal.

Dinamo București 
In the summer of 2012, Scutaru had his contract with Poli Timișoara ended by the Discipline Commission from the Romanian Federation, due to delays in the payments of his salary. Thus, he became a free agent, and signed a contract for five years with Dinamo București.

International career
Scutaru is a former Romania U-19 and Romania U-21 international.

Honours
FC Politehnica Timișoara
Liga II: 2011–2012

Dinamo București
Supercupa României: 2012

ACS Poli Timișoara
Liga II: 2014–2015

External links
 
 

1987 births
Living people
Sportspeople from Reșița
Romanian footballers
Association football defenders
Liga I players
Liga II players
CSM Reșița players
CSM Jiul Petroșani players
FC Politehnica Timișoara players
FC CFR Timișoara players
LPS HD Clinceni players
FC Dinamo București players
ACS Poli Timișoara players
FC UTA Arad players
SSU Politehnica Timișoara players